Benjamin Abrams (August 18, 1893 – June 23, 1967) was a Romanian-born American businessman and a founder of Emerson Radio & Phonograph Corporation after his purchase of Emerson Records in 1922. Along with his brothers he invented a number of devices that are commonplace today, among them midget transistor radios, self-powered radios, and clock radios.

Biography
He was born in Dorohoi, Romania and emigrated with his parents to the United States when he was 12. 

He was a prominent donor to Jewish cause. He was a founder of the Albert Einstein College of Medicine of Yeshiva University, a founder of the Greater New York Committee for Israel Bonds, and a founder and board member of the Federation of Jewish Philanthropies of Greater New York. He served as a member of the board of directors of the United Jewish Appeal, the Weizmann Institute, the Hebrew University in Jerusalem, the American Financial and Development Corporation for Israel, and the American Friends of the Hebrew University. In 1954, he funded the electronic laboratory at the Weizmann Institute at Rehovot which was named in his honor.

Abrams was a Freemason. He was a member of Farragut Lodge No 976 in New York.

He was married to Elizabeth Kramer. In 1964, his daughter Cynthia Abrams married businessman Nelson Peltz; they divorced in 1981.

References

External links
Benjamin Abrams profile on Consumer Electronics Association
How Benjamin Abrams took Emerson Radio and Phonograph Corporation to the corporate top Info at A Touch of Business.com 
Chronological info at consolidatedscrap.com

1893 births
1967 deaths
20th-century American businesspeople
American Freemasons
People from Dorohoi
Romanian emigrants to the United States
20th-century Romanian Jews
20th-century American engineers